The Chinese Ambassador to Sweden is the official representative of the People's Republic of China to the Kingdom of Sweden.

List of representatives

Geng Biao (1950.09 - 1956.02)
Han Nianlong (1956.05 - 1958.10)
Dong Yueqian (1959.01 - 1964.01)
Yang Bozhen (1964.02 - 1969.05)
Wang Dong (politician) (1969.06 - 1971.12)
Wang Luming (1972.03 - 1974.04)
Qin Lizhen (1974.08 - 1979.06)
Cao Keqiang (1979.09 - 1982.12)
Wang Ze (1983.02 - 1984.09)
Wu Jiagan (1984.12 - 1988.06)
Tang Longbin (1988.07 - 1993.07)
Yang Guirong (1993.08 - 1997.02)
Qiao Zonghuai (1997.03 - 1998.10)
Wang Guisheng (1998.12 - 2001.11)
Zou Mingrong (2001.12 - 2004.06)
Lu Fengding (2004.09 - 2008.04)
Chen Mingming (2008.05 - 2011.03)
Lan Lijun (2011.03 - 2017.08)
Gui Congyou (2017.08 - 2021.09)
Cui Aimin (2021.12 - present)

References

Swede
 
China